Rochester Savings Bank is a historic bank building located at Rochester in Monroe County, New York. It is a four-story, "V" shaped structure, sheathed in Kato stone from Minnesota. It was designed by McKim, Mead and White and built in 1927 to house the Rochester Savings Bank.  The building's banking room interior features murals painted by noted artist Ezra Winter.

It was listed on the National Register of Historic Places in 1972.

In 2011, the building was acquired by a group called Rochester Historic Ventures, which then set out to seek occupants that would allow the building to return to public use.

In October 2012, Rochester Institute of Technology announced the creation of a Center for Urban Entrepreneurship, to be housed in the Rochester Savings Bank building.  The university plans to ultimately spend $3–5 million on renovations, eventually resulting in a multidisciplinary center and multiuse venue for RIT students.

In 2016 after a lengthy renovation of the building Center for Urban Entrepreneurship by RIT opened in the building.

Institutional history
The bank was established in 1831 as the first savings (as opposed to commercial) bank west of Albany, New York.  The bank moved to its own building on State Street in 1842, to a second on Main and Fitzhugh Streets in 1857, and to its final building in 1927.

Notable former board members include Colby Chandler (CEO), Marion B. Folsom, and Joseph C. Wilson (entrepreneur).

Notable former employees include Abraham M. Schermerhorn and George Eastman.

Gallery

References

External links

Monroe County (NY) Library System - Rochester Images - Rochester Savings Bank
Center for Urban Entrepreneurship homepage

Commercial buildings in Rochester, New York
Bank buildings on the National Register of Historic Places in New York (state)
McKim, Mead & White buildings
 
Commercial buildings completed in 1927
National Register of Historic Places in Rochester, New York